The Niagara Whalers are a junior ice hockey team based in Port Colborne, Ontario, Canada. They are members of the South Division of the Greater Metro Junior A Hockey League (GMHL). The Whalers were founded in 2014 and joined the GMHL in the 2014–15 season. The club plays their home games at the Vale Health & Wellness Centre.

History

In May 2014, the Whalers were granted a franchise in the Greater Metro Junior A Hockey League (GMHL) for the 2014–15 season. Prior to joining the GMHL, the Whalers competed as a showcase organization in Southern Ontario Bantam and Midget tournaments, winning nine of eleven tournaments. A prospects team will continue to compete in the showcase tournaments and will serve as an affiliate to the Junior A club. After being awarded a GMHL franchise, the Whalers were approved to play out of the Vale Health & Wellness Centre in Port Colborne, Ontario. The Whalers finished their debut regular season in tenth place overall and third in the South Division of the South Conference. The club advanced to Round One of the 2014–15 Russell Cup playoffs where they were drawn against the Halton Ravens. The Whalers were defeated by the Ravens three-games-to-one ending their playoff run. In 2015–16, the league realigned the teams into three divisions, North, Central and South. The Whalers finished the season in fourth place, defeated the Komoka Dragons in the first round in three straight games, before losing to the eventual division Champions in the division semifinals.  In 2016–17,  the league went back to the two conferences, North and South placing the Whalers in the 11 team South Division.

Season-by-season results

Head coaches

Andrew Joyner, 2014–15
Bryan Elliott, 2015–16
Terry Masterson, 2016–present

References

External links
Official website

2014 establishments in Ontario
Ice hockey clubs established in 2014
Ice hockey teams in Ontario